Walnut Creek is a  tributary of the South River in the U.S. state of Georgia. It originates in the city of Hampton in Henry County and flows into South River, which is a branch of the Ocmulgee River.

Modifications
Walnut Creek is dammed to provide a water source for the city of McDonough in Henry County. The name of the resulting body of water is called Fargason Reservoir.

Crossings 
The crossings over Walnut Creek are listed in descending order from the creek's source to its mouth at the South River. All crossings are located in Henry County.

See also
List of rivers of Georgia

References

USGS Hydrologic Unit Map - State of Georgia (1974)

Rivers of Georgia (U.S. state)